Thoros III or Toros III (c. 1271 – 23 July 1298) was king of the Armenian Kingdom of Cilicia, ruling from 1293 to 1298. He was the son of Leo II of Armenia and Kyranna de Lampron, and was part of the House of Lampron. In 1293 his brother Hethum II abdicated in his favour; however, Thoros recalled Hethum to the throne in 1295. The two brought their sister Rita of Armenia to Constantinople to marry the Byzantine emperor Michael IX Palaiologos in 1296, but were imprisoned upon their return in Bardzrberd by their brother Sempad, who had usurped the throne in their absence. Thoros was murdered, strangled to death on July 23, 1298, in Bardzrberd by Oshin, Marshal of Armenia, on Sempad's orders.

Family
Thoros was married twice; his first marriage, to Margaret of Lusignan (ca 1276–1296, Armenia) (the daughter of King Hugh III of Cyprus), took place on January 9, 1288. His only son, by his first marriage, was Leo III of Armenia, who became heir to his uncle Hethum II.  Leo ruled from 1303 to 1307, but was murdered along with his uncle by the Mongol general Bilarghu at a feast.

References

Sources

Cambridge Medieval History, Volume IV, p. 634

13th-century births
1298 deaths
13th-century murdered monarchs
Kings of the Armenian Kingdom of Cilicia
Deaths by strangulation
Hethumid dynasty